Abathomphalus is a genus of foraminifera included in the Globotruncanid family.

Abathomphalus was described and recorded in 1957 by Bolli, Loeblich, and Tappan and distinguished from related general by the "extra-umbilical position of the primary aperture and in the radial sutures on the umbilical side."

The test forms a low to flat  umbilicate trochospiral, with four to five petaloid chambers per whorl. Sutures are curved and oblique,  the periphery angular to truncate, bearing two variously spaced keels bordered by an imperforate band. The wall is calcareous, perforate, with pustules and short costellae on the surface; the primary aperture interiomarginal.

Abathomphalus is the sole genus of the subfamily Abathomphalinae, their descriptions being the same. Although Abathomphalus is included in the planktonic suborder Globigerinina, its description is suggestive of benthic forms.

References 

 Abathomphalus uBio January 12, 2011.
 Hans M. Bolli, John B. Saunders, & Katharina Perch-Nielsen,1989. Plankton stratigraphy: Planktic foraminifera, calcareous nannofossils and calpionellids; CUP Archive. 
 Loeblich A.R. jr, & H Tappan, 1988. Forminiferal Genera and their classification. (e-book) .

Further reading 

Prehistoric Foraminifera genera